This list is of the  of Japan.

Long-distance Nature Trails

See also
 Long-distance trail

References

External links
  Long-distance Nature Trails

Hiking trails in Japan
Japan